Either Way is a 2011 Icelandic comedy film directed by Hafsteinn Gunnar Sigurðsson. Writer-director David Gordon Green and Dogfish Pictures remade Either Way in 2013 as Prince Avalanche.

Cast
 Hilmar Guðjónsson as Alfreð
 Sveinn Ólafur Gunnarsson as Finnbogi
 Þorsteinn Bachmann as the truck driver
 Valgerður Rúnarsdóttir

References

External links
 

2011 films
2011 comedy films
2010s Icelandic-language films
Icelandic comedy films